Rutger Kopland (born Rudi van den Hoofdakker)  (4 August 1934, Goor – 11 July 2012, Glimmen) was a Dutch poet who gained great popularity for his "accessible, thoughtful style, his mild irony, his sentimentality" and whose collections sold over 200,000 copies.

References

1934 births
2012 deaths
Dutch male poets
Dutch psychiatrists
University of Groningen alumni
Academic staff of the University of Groningen
People from Hof van Twente
20th-century Dutch poets
20th-century Dutch male writers
20th-century pseudonymous writers